USS Corinthia (SP-938) was a United States Navy patrol vessel in commission from 1917 to 1918.

Corinthia was built as a private motorboat of the same name in 1909 by Charles Seabury & Company at Morris Heights in the Bronx, New York. In 1917, the U.S. Navy acquired her under a free lease from her owner for use as a section patrol boat during World War I. She was commissioned as USS Corinthia (SP-938) on 14 May 1917.

Assigned to the 8th Naval District, Corinthia patrolled off the coast of Texas and Louisiana for the rest of World War I.

Corinthia was decommissioned on 6 December 1918 and returned to her owner the following day.

References

Department of the Navy Naval History and Heritage Command Online Library of Selected Images: Civilian Ships: Corinthia (American Motor Boat, 1909). Served as USS Corinthia (SP-938) in 1917–1918.
NavSource Online: Section Patrol Craft Photo Archive Corinthia (SP 938)

Patrol vessels of the United States Navy
World War I patrol vessels of the United States
Ships built in Morris Heights, Bronx
1909 ships